The Peter Friedrich Ludwig Hospital (aka Kulturzentrum PFL) is cultural centre and former hospital in the city of Oldenburg, Lower Saxony, Germany.

The hospital was started in 1838 and the building was completed in 1841. It was named after Grand Duke Peter Friedrich Ludwig, who had a number of buildings erected in the Classicistic style during his reign. SInce 1984, the building has been used as a cultural centre with a library and cultural events.

To the northeast is the Edith-Russ-Haus a new media art gallery.

See also
 List of visitor attractions in Oldenburg
 Peter Friedrich Ludwig

References

External links
 

1838 establishments in Germany
Hospital buildings completed in 1841
Defunct hospitals in Germany
Hospitals disestablished in 1984
1984 establishments in Germany
Buildings and structures in Oldenburg (city)
Tourist attractions in Oldenburg (city)
Culture of Lower Saxony
Libraries in Germany
Cultural centers
Classicist architecture in Germany
Medical and health organisations based in Lower Saxony